Gugjeh-ye Yeylaq (also Romanized as Gūgjeh-ye Yeylāq; also known as Gūgjeh and Gūyjah-ye Yeylāq) is a village in Khararud Rural District, in the Central District of Khodabandeh County, Zanjan Province, Iran. At the 2006 census, its population was 843, in 166 families.

References 

Populated places in Khodabandeh County